Bid Sukhteh (also Romanized as Bīd Sūkhteh) is a village in Golbibi Rural District, Marzdaran District, Sarakhs County, Razavi Khorasan Province, Iran. At the 2006 census, its population was 59, in 15 families.

References 

Populated places in Sarakhs County